The Central Election Commission (CEC; ; Pha̍k-fa-sṳ: Tûng-ông Sién-kí Vî-yèn-fi) is the statutory independent agency responsible for managing local and national elections in the Republic of China (Taiwan). It is an important agency which carries out elections and enhances the democracy in the country. It is also charged with improving the election legal system, improve the quality of service, reinforce impartiality and independence. There are also local election commissions in all counties, cities, and municipalities. It is headed by the Chairman of commissioners or Chief of Commissioners.

Functions
The functions of the CEC includes: 
Election Announcement
Candidate Nomination and Registration
Lot-Drawing for determining the order of candidates 
Campaign Activities
Public Forums
Display and Public Releasing Voters’ Lists
Printing Election Bulletins
Election Day
Electee List Announcement
Awarding Electee Certificates

Chairpersons

 Chiu Chuang-huan (16 July 1980 – 1 December 1981)
 Lin Yang-kang (1 December 1981 – 1 June 1984)
 Wu Po-hsiung (1 June 1984 – 22 July 1988; first term)
 Hsu Shui-teh (22 July 1988 – 1 June 1991)
 Wu Po-hsiung (1 June 1991 – 30 July 1994; second term)
 George Huang (30 July 1994 – 16 June 1995; first term)
 Huang Kun-huei (16 June 1995 – 10 June 1996)
 Lin Fong-cheng (10 June 1996 – 15 May 1997)
 Yeh Chin-fong (15 May 1997 – 5 February 1998)
 Huang Chu-wen (5 February 1998 – 17 December 1999)
 George Huang (17 December 1999 – 16 June 2004; second term) 
 Chang Cheng-hsiung (16 June 2004 – 3 November 2009)
 Rai Hau-min (4 November 2009 – 12 October 2010)
 Liu I-chou (13 October 2010 – 14 November 2010) (acting)
 Chang Po-ya (15 November 2010 – 31 July 2014)
 Liu I-chou (1 August 2014 – 28 January 2015) (acting)
 Liu I-chou (29 January 2015 – 3 November 2017)
 Lin Tzu-ling (4 November 2017 – 16 November 2017) (acting)
 Chen In-chin (17 November 2017 – 3 December 2018)
 Chen Chao-chien (4 December 2018 – 24 February 2019) (acting)
 Lee Chin-yung (25 February 2019 –) (incumbent)

See also
 Elections in Taiwan
 Politics of the Republic of China
 List of political parties in Taiwan

References

External links

Central Elections Commission

1980 establishments in Taiwan
Executive Yuan
Taiwan
Government agencies established in 1980